Sekirci is a village in the municipality of Dolneni, North Macedonia.

Demographics
According to the 2021 census, the village had a total of 258 inhabitants. Ethnic groups in the village include:

Macedonians 247
Persons for whom data are taken from administrative sources 11

References

Villages in Dolneni Municipality